Malik Ghulam Murtaza Raheem Khar is a Pakistani politician who was a Member of the Provincial Assembly of the Punjab, from May 2013 to May 2018.

Early life and education
He was born on 19 September 1977 in Muzaffargarh and belongs to landlord Khar family.

He graduated in 1997 from University of the Punjab and has a BA degree.

Political career
He was elected to the Provincial Assembly of the Punjab as an independent candidate from Constituency PP-253 (Muzaffargarh-III) in 2013 Pakistani general election. He joined Pakistan Muslim League (N) in May 2013.

References

Living people
1977 births
Punjab MPAs 2013–2018
Pakistan Muslim League (N) politicians
Ghulam Murtaza Khan
People from Muzaffargarh District
People from Muzaffargarh
Politicians from Muzaffargarh